Skatetown, U.S.A. is a 1979 American comedy musical film produced to capitalize on the short-lived fad of roller disco.

Directed by William A. Levey, the film features many television stars from the 1960s and 1970s, among them Scott Baio, Flip Wilson, Maureen McCormick, Ron Palillo and Ruth Buzzi. Patrick Swayze's leading role as the skater "Ace" was his first movie performance. Also in the cast are Sydney Lassick, Billy Barty and Playboy centerfold model Dorothy Stratten.

Plot 
One evening at a Los Angeles roller disco called Skatetown, U.S.A., a rivalry between two skaters (Patrick Swayze and Greg Bradford) culminates in a contest, the winning prize for which is $1000 and a moped. After a game of chicken played on motorized roller skates, the two rivals become friends.

Cast 
 Scott Baio as Richie
 Flip Wilson as Harvey Ross
 Patrick Swayze as Ace Johnson
 Maureen McCormick as Susan Nelson
 Greg Bradford as Stan Nelson
 Ron Palillo as Frankey
 Judy Landers as Teri
 Ruth Buzzi as Elvira
 Dorothy Stratten as customer at snack bar (girl who orders pizza)
 Joe E. Ross as rent-a-cop
 Dave Mason as himself
 Billy Barty as Jimmy
 Katherine Kelly Lang as Allison
 David Landsberg as Irwin
 Sydney Lassick as Murray
 Murray Langston as the drunk
 Bill Kirchenbauer as Skatetown doctor
 Denny Johnston as the wizard (club DJ)
 Vic Dunlop as Ripple
 Len Bari as Alphonse
 April Allen as Charlene (Ace's girlfriend and skating partner, uncredited)

Production notes
The setting is based on Flipper's Roller Boogie Palace, a disco roller rink which had opened in West Hollywood on Santa Monica Boulevard earlier in 1979 and was fleetingly a very popular celebrity hangout. The film includes many short, broadly comedic and slapstick subplots (such as a gag having to do with itching powder) set between long roller skating sequences and musical performances.

Filming was done mostly at the Hollywood Palladium, built in 1940. Its sprawling blond hardwood dance floor, chandeliers and soap bubbles blown by a machine from the Lawrence Welk Show can be seen in sundry scenes. Some exteriors were shot on Santa Monica Pier and at nearby Venice Beach. Patrick Swayze, who had roller skated competitively as a teenager and was a trained dancer, did his own skating and stunts in the film. April Allen, Swayze's uncredited roller-skating partner in the movie, had won the world championship in women's free skating seven years earlier.

Twenty-nine years after filming, Maureen McCormick recalled, "Like a disco, there was a lot of cocaine being done on the set. Many people were open about it." McCormick wrote that she fell back into severe cocaine addiction during production, often showing up late for shooting or not coming to work at all.

Scott Baio later recalled,
I have blocked that movie from my memory, it was so bad... That was that whole time where Xanadu and Roller Boogie and all that crap was coming out. That was one of those things where they sent me the script and I said 'no,' but they just kept calling and offering more money! I mean, they offered me a lot of money. And finally I said, 'Well, hell. What is it? Two weeks' work? Whatever. Okay. Fine.' And it was… You know, sometimes money isn’t everything. [Laughs.] It was just bad. I mean, it was bad shooting it. I’m trying to think of any real stories that I have, but it was just insanity. When was that? ’79? It was just a guy making a film who didn’t know how to make a film. And I don’t even know what the story was! Skatetown, U.S.A.? That was crapola.

Soundtrack 

The film features almost non-stop synchronized music, much by popular disco and pop artists from the mid and late 1970s. Most of this music is diegetic, in that it is shown within the plot as being played either through records spun by the roller disco's "wizard" DJ or performed on the club's stage and hence, is heard by both the characters and the movie's audience. Dave Mason is featured as a performer in the roller disco, playing himself. Mason sings the movie's disco-tinged theme song "Skatetown" (written by Mason and Brenda Cooper) over the opening credits. He is also shown performing "I Fell in Love" along with a cover of his own 1968 Traffic hit "Feelin' Alright." Among other songs on the soundtrack are the Patrick Hernandez dance hit "Born to Be Alive," "Boogie Wonderland" (Earth, Wind & Fire and The Emotions), "Shake Your Body" (The Jacksons), "Boogie Nights" (Heatwave), "Baby Hold On" (Eddie Money), "Ain't No Stoppin' Us Now" (McFadden & Whitehead), "I Want You to Want Me" (Cheap Trick), "Roller Girl" (John Sebastian), "Perfect Dancer" (Marilyn McCoo and Billy Davis Jr.), Disco Nights (Rock-Freak) by GQ, a cover of Mick Jagger and Keith Richards' "Under My Thumb" by the Hounds, and "Skatetown U.S.A." (John Beal) during the End Credits.

A soundtrack album was released in 1979 by Columbia Records.

Side A:
"Skatetown" – Dave Mason (3:11)
"Boogie Wonderland" – Earth, Wind & Fire (4:49)
"Shake Your Body (Down to the Ground)" – The Jacksons (3:45)
"Boogie Nights" – Heatwave (3:38)
"Born to Be Alive" – Patrick Hernandez (3:23)

Side B:
"Roller Girl" – John Sebastian (3:10)
"Perfect Dancer" – Marilyn McCoo & Billy Davis Jr. (6:28)
"I Fell in Love" – Dave Mason (2:21)
"Under My Thumb" – Hounds (4:17)
"Feelin' Alright" – Dave Mason (4:30)

Reception
Following a widely publicized premiere party at Flipper's roller disco in West Hollywood on October 1, 1979 and billed as the Rock and Roller Disco Movie of the Year, by the time of its release roller disco was a fast-waning fad and the popularity of disco music had peaked (Disco Demolition Night had already happened two and a half months earlier). Aside from some praise for Swayze's skating and screen presence the movie was neither a critical nor a box office success. However, by the early 21st century a writer for oddculture.com called the film "a true cult item and one of the best 70s time capsules around. [...] There’s just something magical about a slutty Marsha [sic] eating drugged pizza with a bearded Horshack."

It was later shown on cable television from time to time. There have been no known licensed VHS or DVD releases. This may be owing to home video licensing woes over the soundtrack's many major label recordings. 35mm and 16mm full frame prints of the movie (which was shot in 35mm and cropped to widescreen for theatrical release) have been exhibited at film revivals and low quality video copies made from a much faded full frame 16mm print have been in commercial circulation. On March 6, 2019, a 35mm print was screened for the first time in years at Los Angeles' New Beverly Cinema on a double bill with another 1979 "skatesploitation" film, Roller Boogie.

Home media
It was announced on the Home Theater Forum site and Blu-ray.com site that Skatetown USA would be released by Sony on to high definition Blu-ray on September 24, 2019. It was the first home media release of Skatetown USA as it had never been officially released on VHS, LaserDisc or DVD. Skatetown USA was released on high-definition Blu-ray on September 24, 2019 as previously reported. The Blu-ray itself was a bare bones release with only the movie itself included on the disc. No extras were included and no menu system was provided on the disc.

References

External links 

 
 
 Roller Disco Cinema: Skatetown, U.S.A. at oddculture.com
 Go Go's blog page about Flipper's Roller Boogie Palace roller rink in West Hollywood

1979 films
Columbia Pictures films
American comedy films
Roller skating films
1970s English-language films
Films scored by Miles Goodman
Disco films
Films shot in Los Angeles
1970s American films